Miaad Shahriar Tehran Football Club is an Iranian football club based in Shahriar, Iran. They currently compete in the 2011–12 Hazfi Cup.

Season-by-Season

The table below shows the achievements of the club in various competitions.

See also
 Hazfi Cup
 Iran Football's 3rd Division 2011–12

Football clubs in Iran
Association football clubs established in 2006
2006 establishments in Iran